The women's doubles tournament at the 1980 French Open was held from 26 May to 8 June 1980 on the outdoor clay courts at the Stade Roland Garros in Paris, France. Kathy Jordan and Anne Smith won the title, defeating Ivanna Madruga and Adriana Villagrán in the final.

Seeds

Draw

Finals

Top half

Bottom half

References

External links
 Main draw
1980 French Open – Women's draws and results at the International Tennis Federation

Women's Doubles
French Open by year – Women's doubles
1980 in women's tennis
1980 in French women's sport